Benjamin Jacob Grimm, also known as The Thing, is a superhero appearing in American comic books published by Marvel Comics. He is a founding member of the Fantastic Four. The Thing was created by writer-editor Stan Lee and artist Jack Kirby, and he first appeared in The Fantastic Four #1 (cover-dated Nov. 1961).

Known for his trademark rocky appearance, he has superhuman strength, a sense of humor, and the battle cry "It's clobberin' time!" Thing's speech patterns are loosely based on Jimmy Durante. Michael Bailey Smith played Ben Grimm in his human form, while Carl Ciarfalio played the Thing in The Fantastic Four film from 1994, Michael Chiklis portrayed the Thing in the 2005 film Fantastic Four and its 2007 sequel Fantastic Four: Rise of the Silver Surfer. Jamie Bell acted the part in Fantastic Four (2015).

Publication history

Created by writer-editor Stan Lee and artist Jack Kirby, the character first appeared in The Fantastic Four #1 (Nov. 1961). Kirby modeled the character after himself.

In addition to appearing in the Fantastic Four, the Thing has been the star of Marvel Two-in-One, Strange Tales (with his fellow Fantastic Four member the Human Torch), and two incarnations of his own eponymous series, as well as numerous miniseries and one-shots.

Strange Tales
The Thing joined his Fantastic Four partner and frequent rival the Human Torch in #124 (1964) of Strange Tales, which previously featured solo adventures of the Human Torch and backup Doctor Strange stories. The change was intended to liven the comic through the always humorous chemistry between the Torch and the Thing. They were replaced in #135 (1965) with the "modern-day" version of Nick Fury, Agent of S.H.I.E.L.D., who had already been appearing in Sgt. Fury and his Howling Commandos.

Marvel Two-in-One (1974–1983)
After a 1973 try-out in two issues of Marvel Feature, the Thing starred in the long-running series Marvel Two-in-One. In each issue, Ben Grimm would team up with another character from the Marvel Universe, often an obscure or colorful character. The series helped to introduce characters from Marvel's lineup, by way of teaming up with the more recognizable Thing. In 1992, Marvel reprinted four Two-in-One stories (#50, 51, 77 and 80) as a miniseries under the title The Adventures of the Thing. The series was cancelled after 100 issues and seven Annuals to make way for a solo series.

The Thing (1983–1986)
The cancellation of Marvel Two-in-One led to the Thing's first completely solo series, which ran for 36 issues. It was originally written by John Byrne and later, Mike Carlin. The series also featured art by Ron Wilson and later by Paul Neary. It elaborated on Ben Grimm's poor childhood on Yancy Street in its early issues, and chronicled the Thing's later foray into the world of professional wrestling. It also featured a major storyline offshoot from Marvel's Secret Wars event, in which the Thing elects to remain on the Beyonder's Battleworld after discovering that the planet enables him to return to human form at will. A full third of the series' stories take place on Battleworld.

2002–present
In 2002, Marvel released The Thing: Freakshow, a four-issue miniseries written by Geoff Johns and illustrated by Scott Kolins, in which the Thing travels across the United States by train, inadvertently stumbling upon a deformed gypsy boy he once ridiculed as a teenager, who is now the super-strong main attraction of a troupe of traveling circus freaks. He later discovers a town full of alien Kree and Skrull warriors fighting over a Watcher infant.

In 2003, Marvel released a four-issue miniseries written by Evan Dorkin and illustrated by Dean Haspiel, The Thing: Night Falls on Yancy Street. The story was more character-driven than the stories that usually feature the Thing. Tom Spurgeon found its outlook on relationships "depressing".

After the success of the 2005 Fantastic Four feature film and events in the comics series that resulted in Grimm becoming a millionaire, the Thing was once again given his own series in 2005, The Thing, written by Dan Slott and penciled by Andrea Di Vito and Kieron Dwyer. It was canceled with issue #8 in 2006.

The Thing was a member of The New Avengers, when that team debuted in their self-titled second series in 2010. He appeared as a regular character throughout the 2010–2013 New Avengers series, from issue #1 (Aug. 2010) through its final issue #34 (Jan. 2013).

Fictional character biography

Background
Born on Yancy Street in New York City's Lower East Side, to a Jewish family, Benjamin Jacob "Ben" Grimm has an early life of poverty and hardship, shaping him into a tough, streetwise scrapper. His older brother Daniel, whom Ben idolizes, is killed in a street gang fight when Ben is eight years old. This portion of his own life is modeled on that of Jack Kirby, who grew up on tough Delancey Street, whose brother died when he was young, whose father was named Benjamin, and who was named Jacob at birth. Following the death of his parents, Ben is raised by his Uncle Jake (who married a much younger wife, Petunia, who becomes a frequent reference used by the character until her death). He comes to lead the Yancy Street gang at one point.

Excelling in football as a high school student, Ben receives a full scholarship to Empire State University, where he first meets his eventual lifelong friend in a teenaged genius named Reed Richards, as well as future enemy Victor von Doom. Despite their being from radically different backgrounds, science student Richards describes to Grimm his dream of building a space rocket to explore the regions of space around Mars; Grimm jokingly agrees to fly that rocket when the day comes.

The details of his life story have been modified over the decades. Prior to the stories published in the 1970s, Grimm, after earning multiple advanced degrees in engineering, serves in the United States Marine Corps as a test pilot during World War II. These exploits are chronicled to a limited extent in Captain Savage and his Leatherneck Raiders #7. While in the military, Nick Fury sends him, Logan and Carol Danvers on a top secret surveillance mission into Vladivostok. Following this, he becomes an astronaut for NASA, taking part in attempts to reach the Moon, occurring at a time before any crewed space ship had escaped Earth's orbit.

Religion
In keeping with an early taboo in the comic superhero world against revealing a character's religion, the fact that Grimm is Jewish was not explicitly revealed until four decades after his creation, in the story "Remembrance of Things Past" in Fantastic Four vol. 3, #56 (Aug. 2002). In this story, Grimm returns to his old neighborhood to find Mr. Sheckerberg, a pawn shop owner he knew as a child. Flashbacks during this story reveal Grimm's Jewish heritage. He recites the Shema, an important Jewish prayer often recited, over the dying Sheckerberg, who eventually recovers. In a later story, Grimm agrees to celebrate his Bar Mitzvah, since it has been 13 years, the age a Jewish boy celebrates his Bar Mitzvah, since he began his "second life" as the Thing. To celebrate the ceremony, Grimm organizes a poker tournament for every available superhero in the Marvel Universe.

In the 2004 Fantastic Four story "Hereafter Part 1: A Glimpse of God", the Thing is killed by an energy weapon wielded by Reed Richards, but is brought back to life in one story by the hand of God.

Out of universe, Jack Kirby featured the Thing on his family's 1976 Hanukkah card.

The Thing

Some years later, Reed Richards, now a successful scientist, once again makes contact with Grimm. Richards has built his spaceship, and reminds Grimm of his promise to fly it. After the government denies him permission to fly the spaceship himself, Richards plots a clandestine flight piloted by Grimm and accompanied by his future wife Susan Storm, who had helped provide funding for the rocket, and her younger brother Johnny Storm, who helped the group gain access to the launch system. Although reluctant to fly the rocket, Ben is persuaded to do so by Sue, for whom he has a soft spot. During this unauthorized ride into the upper atmosphere of Earth and the Van Allen Belts, they are pelted by a cosmic ray storm and exposed to radiation against which the ship's shields are no protection. Upon crashing down to Earth, each of the four learn that they have developed fantastic superhuman abilities. Grimm's skin is transformed into a thick, lumpy orange hide, which gradually evolves into his now-familiar craggy covering of large rocky plates. Richards proposes the quartet band together to use their new abilities for the betterment of humanity, and Grimm, in a moment of self-pity, adopts the super-heroic sobriquet, the Thing. The team clashes with the Mole Man in their first appearance.

Trapped in his monstrous form, Grimm is an unhappy yet reliable member of the team. He trusts in his friend Reed Richards to one day develop a cure for his condition. However, when he encounters blind sculptress Alicia Masters, Grimm develops an unconscious resistance to being transformed back to his human form. Subconsciously fearing that Masters prefers him to remain in the monstrous form of the Thing, Grimm's body rejects various attempts by Richards to restore his human form, lest he lose Masters' love. Grimm has remained a stalwart member of the Fantastic Four for years. The Thing first fought the Hulk early in his career, with many such further clashes over the years. Not long after that, he is first reverted to his human form, but is then restored to his Thing form to battle Doctor Doom.

Grimm has been temporarily replaced on the team twice. First, after Grimm temporarily lost his powers and reverted to human form, Reed Richards hired Luke Cage (then using the code name "Power Man") to take his place until Richards had completed a Thing-suit for Ben (however, Ben unexpectedly reverted into the actual Thing again later on).

Years later, after Grimm chose to remain on Battleworld in the aftermath of the "Secret Wars" due to his apparent control over his transformation between his human and mutated states, he asked the She-Hulk to fill in for him. Mister Fantastic did leave him with the device needed to return to Earth when it comes time. The Thing's time on Battleworld lasted until Ben's eventually deciding to return home after defeating Ultron and slaying his manifested dark side Grimm the Sorcerer. Once he left, the planet had no more reason to exist and so it broke apart.

On returning to Earth, he learns that Alicia had become romantically involved with his teammate Johnny Storm during his absence (it is eventually revealed that this Alicia was actually the Skrull impostor Lyja). An angry Grimm wallows in self-pity for a time, later on accompanying the West Coast Avengers, and actually joining the team for a while. Eventually, he returns to his surrogate family as leader of the Fantastic Four when Mr. Fantastic and the Invisible Woman leave the team to raise their son Franklin, at which point Ben invites Crystal and Ms. Marvel II (Sharon Ventura) to fill their slots. Soon after Sharon and Ben are irradiated with cosmic rays, Sharon becomes the She-Thing, lumpy much like Ben was in his first few appearances, while Ben mutates into a new rockier, more powerful form.

After being further mutated into the more monstrous rocky form, Ben is briefly changed back to his human form, and returned leadership of the Fantastic Four to Reed Richards. Grimm once more returned to his traditional orange rocky form out of love for Ms. Marvel. He remains a steadfast member of the Fantastic Four.

In the 21st century
In a Fantastic Four comic published in 2005, Ben learns that he is entitled to a large sum of money, his share of the Fantastic Four fortune, which Reed Richards had never touched, as he had the shares of the other teammates (who were family members) to pay off various debts of the group.

The Thing uses his newfound wealth to build a community center in his old neighborhood on Yancy Street, the "Grimm Youth Center". Thinking the center is named after the Thing himself, the Yancy Street Gang plans to graffiti the building exterior, but discovers the building was actually named after Daniel Grimm, Ben's deceased older brother and former leader of the gang. The relationship between the Yancy Streeters and the Thing is then effectively reconciled, or at least changed to a more good-natured, playful rivalry (as exemplified by the comic ending, with the Yancy Streeters spray-painting the sleeping Thing).

Some personality traits of the cantankerously lovable, occasionally cigar-smoking, Jewish native of the Lower East Side are popularly recognized as having been inspired by those of co-creator Jack Kirby, who in interviews has said he intended Grimm to be an alter ego of himself.

Civil War/The Initiative
Initially in the 2006 storyline "Civil War", Ben is a reluctant member of the pro-registration side of the controversy over the 2006 Superhuman Registration Act (SHRA), until he witnesses a battle on Yancy Street in which Captain America's forces try to rescue captured allies held by Iron Man's forces. The Fantastic Four's foes the Mad Thinker and the Puppet Master try to escalate the battle, using a mind-controlled Yancy Streeter to deliver a bomb. The young man dies and the Thing verbally blasts both sides for not caring about the civilians caught in the conflict. He announces that, while he thinks the registration is wrong, he is also not going to fight the government and is thus leaving the country for France. While in France, he meets Les Héros de Paris (The Heroes of Paris).

Ben returns to New York as both sides of the SHRA battle in the city. Indifferent to choosing sides, Ben focuses on protecting civilians from harm.

In Fantastic Four #543 (March 2007), Ben celebrates the Fantastic Four's 11th anniversary along with the Human Torch, and latecomers Reed and Sue. The aftermath of the Civil War is still being felt in this issue, as Ben and Johnny (and even Franklin) consider the future of the team and Reed and Sue's marriage. When Reed and Sue arrive near issue's end, they announce that they are taking a break from the team and have found two replacement members: the Black Panther, and Storm of the X-Men. The title of the story in this issue is a quote from Ben, "Come on, Suzie, don't leave us hangin'."

Ben Grimm served as one of the pallbearers at the memorial service for Captain America, along with Tony Stark, Ms. Marvel, Rick Jones, T'Challa and Sam Wilson.

Ben has been identified as Number 53 of the 142 registered superheroes who appear on the cover of the comic book Avengers: The Initiative #1.

"World War Hulk"
Ben once again tries to take on the Hulk within the events of the 2007 storyline "World War Hulk" to buy Reed Richards the time he needs to complete his plans for the Hulk. Ben gives his best shots, but the Hulk takes his punches without slowing down. The Hulk proceeds to knock out Ben by punching both sides of his head simultaneously. He is later seen captive in Madison Square Garden, which the Hulk has turned into a gladiatorial arena, with an obedience disk fitted on him.

Released from his imprisonment, Ben, Spider-Man, and Luke Cage attack the Warbound, with Ben fighting Korg. Their battle is brought to an abrupt end when Hiroim repairs the damage to Manhattan Island, drawing the energy to do so from Ben and Korg.

Secret Invasion
In the Secret Invasion: Fantastic Four miniseries, the Skrull Lyja, posing as Sue, sends the Baxter Building, with Ben, Johnny, Franklin, and Valeria inside, into the Negative Zone. Not long after their arrival, Ben has to protect Franklin and Valeria from an impending onslaught of giant insects. With the aid of the Tinkerer, who Ben broke out of the Negative Zone Prison, they, with the exception of Lyja who stayed behind, were able to return to the regular Marvel Universe just after the invasion was over.

Heroic Age
Following the Siege of Asgard, Luke Cage asks Ben to serve on his Avengers team. Although Ben states that his loyalty will always be to the Fantastic Four, Cage confirms that he is not asking Ben to resign from his original team, merely suggesting that Ben split his time between the two teams, as Wolverine divides his time between the X-Men and the Avengers.

"Fear Itself"
During the 2011 "Fear Itself" storyline, Ben lifts one of the seven fallen hammers of the Serpent and becomes Angrir: Breaker of Souls. In this form, he then destroys Yancy Street and Avengers Tower, and battles Spider-Man, Mister Fantastic and Invisible Woman, before confronting Thor, who seriously wounds him. Franklin then uses his powers to restore Ben to his normal self, free from the Serpent's possession.

"Original Sin"
In the 2014 "Original Sin" storyline, after learning from the eye of the murdered Uatu that Johnny Storm unintentionally sabotaged an experiment that could have allowed Grimm to become human again, Ben is found having apparently murdered the Puppet Master; the crime was committed in a sealed room that even Reed Richards could barely penetrate, with Alicia Masters as the only witness. Although Ben claims innocence, his depression over recent events prompts him to accept incarceration in the Raft. Although power-dampeners in the Raft restrict his strength to a more manageable level, he is attacked by various other thick-skinned superhumans — including the Armadillo and Ironclad — on orders of the current 'boss' of the prison, Sharon Ventura, the She-Thing. Eventually, Ben forms an alliance with the Sandman and manages to escape the prison with the aid of a plan coordinated by the She-Hulk and Ant-Man, allowing him to rejoin Sue and Johnny to investigate Reed's recent abduction, revealing that the dead Puppet Master came from the alternate Earth Franklin had created.

Post-Secret Wars
As the Fantastic Four disbanded in the aftermath of the "Secret Wars" storyline, the Thing is working with the Guardians of the Galaxy, and the Human Torch is acting as an ambassador with the Inhumans and becoming part of the Uncanny Avengers.

During the 2017 "Secret Empire" storyline, the Thing appears as a member of the Underground, which is a resistance movement against HYDRA ever since they took over the United States, until the real Captain America returns, ending HYDRA's empires and defeating his HYDRA counterpart.

Fantastic Four Return
To help the Thing cope with Mister Fantastic and the Invisible Woman's disappearance, the Human Torch takes him on a journey through the Multiverse, using the Multisect to find them. They have not been able to find Mister Fantastic and the Invisible Woman, as they return to Earth-616 empty-handed. The Thing and the Human Torch were reunited with Mister Fantastic and the Invisible Woman to help alongside other superheroes who were part of the Fantastic Four (including, surprisingly, X-Men member Iceman) fight the Griever at the End of All Things after Mister Fantastic persuaded the Griever to let him summon the Thing and the Human Torch. As the Thing and his teammates finally return to 616, while the Future Foundation stays behind to keep learning about the Multiverse, the Thing reveals to them that he and Alicia proposed their wedding and are about to get married soon. Although the Baxter Building is now owned by a new superhero team, Fantastix, the Thing allows his teammates to use his hometown in Yancy Street as their current operation base.

Relationships
The Thing is generally well liked by other heroes within the Marvel Universe. Grimm's relationship with his teammates has been a close but occasionally edgy one given his temper. He and Johnny Storm (the Human Torch) often argue and clash but they do respect each other.

Grimm's first love interest is the blind Alicia Masters, and he is intensely protective of her. When Johnny starts a relationship of his own with Alicia and they become engaged, Grimm is upset. However, he has to concede that, unlike himself and his stone-covered body, Johnny can "be a man". He agrees to act as best man at their wedding. The relationship between Alicia and Johnny is ended with the revelation that the Alicia that Johnny fell in love with is actually Lyja, a member of the shape-changing alien race known as the Skrulls. The real Alicia, who was kept in suspended animation, is rescued by the Fantastic Four and reunited with the Thing.

Ben begins dating a teacher named Debbie Green. Ben soon asks Debbie to marry him, which she accepts. He later leaves her at the altar when he realizes the dangers of the wives of superheroes.

Grimm is best friends with Reed Richards, whom he addresses with the nickname "Stretch", due to Richards' natural height and his ability to stretch his body. However, Grimm also holds Reed responsible for his condition, since Richards had dismissed the potential danger of the cosmic rays that gave them their powers, although Grimm had taken them very seriously. At times of real frustration towards Reed, Grimm refers to him simply as "Richards".

Grimm is the godfather of Reed and Sue's son Franklin, who affectionately calls him "Unca Ben".

Powers and abilities

The Thing's primary superhuman power is his great physical strength. Over the years, as a result of further mutation and rigorous training on machines designed by Reed Richards, his strength has increased dramatically.

He is capable of surviving impacts of great force without sustaining injury, as his body is covered with an orange, flexible, rock-like hide. He is also able to withstand gunfire from high-caliber weapons as well as armor-piercing rounds. It is possible to breach his exterior, however, and he does bleed as a result. One such instance involved Wolverine's adamantium claws scarring The Thing's face.

The Thing's highly advanced musculature generates fewer fatigue toxins during physical activity, granting him superhuman levels of stamina. When in his Thing form, he has only four fingers on each hand and four toes on each foot. The loss of one digit of each hand and foot, aside from the increase in volume of the remainder, does not affect his manual dexterity. However, he has been shown doing things like holding a pencil and using it to dial a phone (even with rotary dials), or to push buttons on a keypad, to use devices that would ordinarily be too small for him.

Aside from his physical attributes, the Thing's senses can withstand higher levels of sensory stimulation than an ordinary human, with the exception of his sense of touch. His lungs are possessed of greater efficiency and volume than those of an ordinary human. As a result, the Thing is capable of holding his breath for much longer periods of time.

The Thing is an exceptionally skilled pilot, due to his time spent as a test pilot in the United States Marine Corps and as a founding member of the Fantastic Four. He is also a formidable and relentless hand-to-hand combatant. His fighting style incorporates elements of boxing, wrestling, judo, jujitsu, and street-fighting techniques, as well as hand-to-hand combat training from the military.

On occasion, when Ben Grimm regained his human form and lost his Thing powers, he used a suit of powered battle armor designed by Reed Richards that simulated the strength and durability of his mutated body, albeit to a weaker degree. Wearing the suit, which was designed to physically resemble his rocky form, Ben continued to participate in the Fantastic Four's adventures. The first exo-skeletal Thing suit was destroyed after Galactus restored Ben's natural powers and form. A second suit was built (presumably by Richards) and used sporadically when Ben had been returned to his human form again.

Reed has failed many times to restore Ben permanently to human form. When Doom reverses Sharon Ventura's similar cosmic-ray transformation, he uses both science and magic. Ben is almost immortal when in his Thing form, as he only ages when he is human. After Franklin and Valeria create a formula that allows Ben to become human for one week each year, Reed and Nathaniel traveled over 3,000 years into the future to see Ben still alive after all that time.

Other versions

1602
In Neil Gaiman's Marvel 1602, Benjamin Grimm is the captain of the ship The Fantastick, before gaining his abilities from the Anomaly. His power is associated with the classical element of earth.

In the sequel, 1602: Fantastick Four, Benjamin finds work as an actor with William Shakespeare's troupe, where he can hide his monstrous form behind false whiskers as Falstaff. He is soon forced to reveal himself, however, when Otto von Doom's vulture soldiers kidnap Shakespeare.

Age of Apocalypse
In the Age of Apocalypse, Ben Grimm never becomes the Thing, and instead is a Human High Council Agent, fighting Apocalypse's forces, alongside Clint Barton (Hawkeye), Donald Blake (Thor), Carol Danvers (Ms. Marvel), Gateway, Gwen Stacy, Tony Stark (Iron Man), Susan Storm (Invisible Woman), and Victor von Doom (Doctor Doom). In his place, Bruce Banner becomes a Grey Hulk-like monster called the Thing. in What If?: X-Men Age of Apocalypse #1 (2007), Ben is a member of the Defenders, the Age of Apocalypse version of the Avengers/Ultimates.

Age of Ultron
In the Age of Ultron, the Thing along with Human Torch and Mister Fantastic are shown to seemingly perish by attacks from multiple Ultron drones.

Earth-A
In this universe, Ben and Reed Richards are the only occupants of the experimental spacecraft that exposes them to cosmic rays. Ben is called "Mr. Fantastic" and has stretching and flame powers instead.

Earth-818
On Earth-818 which was conquered by Multiversal Masters of Evil member Black Skull, a version of Ben Grimm called Infinity Thing appears as a member of the resistance against Black Skull that is led by Ant-Man (this Earth's version of Tony Stark). He is described as an astronaut who went into outer space and came back with a multicolored rock-skinned body. Following Black Skull's defeat, Ant-Man joins Robbie Reyes and his Deathlok companion in their quest to liberate the enslaved Earths from the Multiversal Masters of Evil as he leaves Infinity Thing and Wonder Man to rebuild Earth-818.

Fantastic Four: The End
In this six-issue miniseries, the entire Solar System is being colonized by humanity, with humanity undergoing a Golden Age because of the use of technology developed by Reed Richards in an effort to create a utopia. The Thing is married to Alicia Masters, has three super-powered children, and resides on Mars with the Inhumans. He is now capable of shifting between his human form and 'Thing' form at will.

Heroes Reborn
In this alternative universe, Ben and Johnny share a more dangerous adversarial relationship, knowing each other even before the ill-fated spaceflight.

House of M
In the House of M limited series, Ben is the pilot in Reed Richards' voyage to space, alongside Susan Storm and John Jameson. Like the others, Grimm is mutated, though he is the only survivor of the rocket's explosion. Ben is transformed into a rock-skinned creature with superhuman strength and a diminished intellect. He is taken in by Dr. Doom, who names him the It. The It becomes one of the Fearsome Four, though he is treated like an animal and often the victim of Doom's frustrations.

Marvel Mangaverse
In the Marvel Mangaverse comics Benjamin (pronounced "Ben-ya-meen") Grimm is a member of the Megascale Metatalent Response Team Fantastic Four.

MC2
In the alternative future timeline of the Marvel universe published under the MC2 imprint, Ben is still a member of the Fantastic Four, whose roster has expanded to make them the Fantastic 5. In this future, he is married to Sharon Ventura and has a set of twin children by her (Jacob and Alyce), though they are now divorced. He appears alongside the F5 whenever they appear in the Spider-Girl series and related mini-series.

New Amsterdam
In Marvel Two-in-One #50 (April 1979), Reed Richards advises Ben that the cure Reed has developed for his condition will not work. Ben time-travels to the past to give himself the cure at an earlier stage, where it might work. It does, but on return to the present, nothing has changed. Reed advises him that he succeeded only in creating an alternative universe. In Marvel Two-in-One #100 (June 1983), Reed examines records of that trip and determines that Ben did not create that reality after all, based on a newspaper that shows the name of the city as "New Amsterdam" instead of "New York". Ben returns to that reality, where Ben Grimm is a bartender and the leader of the remaining humans in a post-apocalyptic city.

Ruins
In Warren Ellis' 1995 Ruins miniseries, Ben refuses to fly Reed's ship the Astraea, feeling it inadequately engineered. Victor von Doom pilots it instead. This results in the horrific mutation and subsequent deaths of all on board. Grimm avoids becoming the Thing, but is left to live with the guilt of thinking he could have prevented the tragedy. Grimm's decision to refuse Richards' offer seems to be the single moment that caused this reality to go horribly wrong, with ramifications leading to a corrupt government, concentration camps and the horrific fates of the would-be Marvels of this universe.

Spider-Gwen
In this reality where Gwen Stacy became Spider-Woman, Ben Grimm is an NYPD cop who never became the Thing. Noticeably out of all the Fantastic Four members in this reality, Ben is the only one who is an adult, as Johnny and Sue are child television stars and Reed is a kid genius.

Ultimate Marvel
In the Ultimate Marvel universe, Ben is Reed's childhood friend: Ben would protect Reed from bullies and Reed would help Ben with his homework. When Ben is invited to watch Reed's teleportation experiment, he is caught in it with Reed and the others. The resulting event gives Ben a rocky hide and enormous strength.

In one storyline, the four travel through time to prevent Reed's experiment from failing.  Instead, he contacts the Skrulls, and the resultant trade of information gives humanity super-powers from the aliens, rather than from the accident.  While most of the Fantastic Four gain the same powers they would have in most other worlds, Ben himself opts to refuse.  When the Skrulls betray humanity and the super-powered humans are all killed, Ben confronts their leader and travels back in time once more to set things "right," although he sacrifices himself in the process.

Later, Ben transforms again, potentially thanks to Reed, back to a more human form, as if the rocky exterior were a cocoon. In his new form, he typically appears human, but his skin may take on a purple glow accompanying moments of strength. Other abilities include the capacity to move through Susan's force fields and others hinted at but yet unclear.

At the end of the Doomsday trilogy, Ben and Susan were engaged.

Counter Earth
On Counter Earth, counterparts of the Fantastic Four hijack an experimental spaceship to be the first humans in space. The Man-Beast negates the effects of the cosmic radiation for all of them except Reed Richards, who succumbs to the effects a decade later. Ben Grimm's counterpart is shown to be unaffected by the cosmic radiation and is currently assisting Richards by gathering data held by the High Evolutionary.

What If?
In What If Doctor Doom Had Become the Thing? #1 (February 2005), Doom befriends Reed Richards during their college days, and Ben is left out. Dropping out of college, Ben joins the Army. Doom and Reed go ahead with their experimental rocket. When the cosmic rays turn Doom into a Thing-like creature, he attacks Reed, sending him into a gamma bomb test site, where Ben is stationed. Ben saves Reed from the bomb's radiation, but is transformed into a Hulk-like creature. Calling himself "Grimm", he fights and defeats Doom. After Reed calms him down, Ben joins him in forming the Fantastic Four.

In What If? #11, the original Marvel bullpen becomes the Fantastic Four (Jack Kirby becomes the Thing, Stan Lee becomes Mr. Fantastic, etc.) when cosmic rays from a booby-trapped package sent by the "S" people (Skrulls) bombard the Bullpen in their office. This Thing has the ability to resume normal form when he sets out to work on drawing Marvel Comics, but this was used only once in the story.

In What If? vol. 2 #11 (March 1990), the origins of the Fantastic Four are retold in four stories, each showing how the heroes' lives would have changed if all four had each gained the same powers as the individual members of the original Fantastic Four.

Invisibility: The Fantastic Four gain Invisible Woman-style powers and battle Doctor Doom as S.H.I.E.L.D. agents. Ben can project invisible force fields.
Stretching: Finding the Mr. Fantastic-style power absurd, Ben never uses it and ends up marrying Sue Storm.
Monsters: The Fantastic Four all turn into monsters and go to live on Monster Island. Ben looks like his Earth-616 self.
Torches: The flame-powered Fantastic Four disband after being unable to save a child from a fire. Ben joins the Avengers, calling himself the Human Torch.

Marvel Zombies/Ultimate Fantastic Four
In this miniseries, the Thing, along with the other three members of the Fantastic Four, is a cannibalistic zombie because of an alien virus infection that has spread to all heroes.Reed Richards has gone insane after deliberately infecting Sue Storm, Johnny Storm, and Ben Grimm. They turn into zombies and infect Reed, too, who willingly allows them to do so to feel what being infected is like. Zombie Reed contacts Ultimate Reed and his Ultimate team counterparts and is subsequently foiled. They are even foiled by Magneto, who had saved Ultimate Reed from the zombies. The Thing and the others find Ultimate Doctor Doom's body swapped with Ultimate Reed. Ultimate Reed (in Ultimate Doom's body) kills all of the Fantastic Four. The Thing is seemingly killed by Reed/Doom when he rips off his arm and beats him with it, but his remains are sent back to his universe.

In other media

Television
The Thing appears in Fantastic Four (1967), voiced by Paul Frees.
The Thing appears in The New Fantastic Four, voiced by Ted Cassidy.
The Thing appears in the package show Fred and Barney Meet the Thing with Benjy Grimm voiced by Wayne Morton and the Thing voiced by Joe Baker. This incarnation of the Thing was a scrawny, teenaged "Benjy" Grimm who could transform into his heroic identity with his "Thing rings", one worn on each hand, by bringing his fists together to connect the rings (with the cry, "Thing ring, do your thing!").
The Thing appears in Fantastic Four (1994), voiced by Chuck McCann.
The Thing later appears in Spider-Man, voiced by Patrick Pinney. He appears during the "Secret Wars" storyline along with the rest of the Fantastic Four. The Thing plays a major role in the final conflict with Doctor Doom. Doctor Doom captures the Thing at New Latveria and reverts him back into his human form while providing him a special wrist device that enables him to change at will. Doctor Doom uses the information he gives Ben to steal the Beyonder's power and is only defeated when he turns his own weapon on him. After Spider-Man's side is declared victorious and his allies are to be returned to Earth, the Thing commented that he would lose his ability to change back into Ben Grimm.
The Thing appears in The Incredible Hulk episode "Fantastic Fortitude", voiced again by Chuck McCann. The episode seems to place this show in the same continuity with the Fantastic Four cartoon of the same decade as this episode plays off the Hulk's appearance in it. She-Hulk flirted with him, but Ben chose to rekindle his relationship with Alicia Masters. The Thing also fell for the pranks of the Yancy Street Gang as well.
The Thing appears in Fantastic Four: World's Greatest Heroes, voiced by Brian Dobson. This version has the Fantastic Four symbol spray painted onto his chest.
The Thing appears on The Super Hero Squad Show, voiced by Dave Boat. He makes a cameo appearance with the other Fantastic Four members in the show's pilot episode, and has a much bigger role on the second episode where he helps save the Silver Surfer.
The Thing appears in The Avengers: Earth's Mightiest Heroes, voiced by Fred Tatasciore. In "The Casket of Ancient Winters", He and the Human Torch help the Avengers fight ice monsters after Malekith the Accursed opened the Casket of Ancient Winters. The Thing returns alongside the rest of the Fantastic Four in the episode "The Private War of Doctor Doom". He and the Hulk have a somewhat childish rivalry because the Thing never beat him in a fight. The Thing joins the New Avengers in the episode of the same name after the regular Avengers are trapped by Kang the Conqueror. The Thing and the Fantastic Four assist the Avengers while battling Galactus and his heralds in the season 2 finale "Avengers Assemble".
The Thing appears in the Ultimate Spider-Man episode "The Incredible Spider-Hulk", voiced again by Dave Boat. When Spider-Man (mind-switched into Hulk's body by Mesmero) ends up in town, he is attacked by the Thing when he was summoned by Nick Fury to try to contain the Hulk. Spider-Man, Hulk (who is in Spider-Man's body) and the Thing eventually clear things up, corner Mesmero, and force him to switch Spider-Man and the Hulk's minds back.
The Thing appears in the Hulk and the Agents of S.M.A.S.H. episode "The Collector", with Dave Boat reprising his role. He is seen playing poker with the Hulk, the Red Hulk and the She-Hulk. The Thing is captured alongside them and is taken by the Collector to be a part of his collection. The Agents of S.M.A.S.H and Spider-Man free him along with the other heroes. In the episode "Monsters No More", the Thing was with the Fantastic Four when they and the Agents of S.M.A.S.H. fight the Tribbitites.
The Thing appears in the Avengers Assemble episode "Hulk's Day Out", voiced again by Dave Boat. It is revealed that he and Hulk go bowling at a bowling alley on Yancy Street.

Film
Michael Bailey Smith plays Ben Grimm (with Carl Ciarfalio portraying The Thing) in the 1994 The Fantastic Four produced by Roger Corman. Created to secure copyright to the property, the producers never intended it for release, although the director, actors, and other participants were not informed of this fact.
The Thing is featured in the 2005 film released by 20th Century Fox, in which he is portrayed by Michael Chiklis. In the film, while being outside the space station carrying out surveys, Ben is exposed to the cosmic cloud with the least amount of protection. He is briefly cured of his 'condition' when Victor von Doom powers a chamber Mister Fantastic made that can negate the radiation that transformed him. After learning that Doom perfected the process so that he could drain the power of the Thing and use it to enhance his own, Grimm subjects himself to the chamber again and turns himself into the Thing. In this film, the Thing is from Brooklyn, rather than the Lower East Side, and was engaged before his transformation. His fiancé leaves him as she cannot cope with his change and Ben meets Alicia while drinking in a bar.
Chiklis reprised his role as the Thing in the sequel Fantastic Four: Rise of the Silver Surfer, in which he has mostly accepted his appearance, accepting the occasional joke about his relationship with Alicia. He briefly swaps powers with Johnny (the Human Torch) to demonstrate Johnny's odd condition, Johnny's powers having become unstable after his encounter with the Silver Surfer. When Victor shows himself, Ben immediately charges him and threatens to break his neck. He is later one of three to let Johnny borrow his powers, using a crane to help Johnny separate Doom from the Surfer's board while Reed stays with the injured Sue.
Jamie Bell portrayed Grimm in Fantastic Four while also providing the voice and motion-capture for the Thing. When he and Reed work on a prototype teleporter, they attract the attention of the Baxter Foundation's director, Franklin Storm. During a mission to Planet Zero, Ben is transformed into a rocky form. Though Reed sees Ben in his mutated state, he was unable to free him upon the alarm going off about Reed's escape. Reed vows to come back for Ben. One year later, Ben was shown taking part in stopping wars. When Susan Storm finds Reed, Ben is sent with the government to South America, where Ben manages to headbutt Reed into unconsciousness. While being brought to Area 57, Reed apologizes to Ben for not finding a cure for him. At the time when Victor von Doom returns from Planet Zero and plans to use it on Earth, Ben helps Reed, Susan, and Johnny fight Victor.
Tim Miller's original plans for Deadpool 2 involved having the Thing from the 2015 Fantastic Four film fighting against the Juggernaut during the film's climax. However, while the studio approved the character's appearance, these were dropped once Miller exited from the project and the part went to Colossus.

Video games
The Thing's first video game appearance was in 1984 in the Scott Adams adventure game Questprobe featuring the Human Torch and the Thing, which was released for the following 8-bit platforms: Amstrad CPC, Apple II, Atari 8-bit, Commodore 64, ZX Spectrum, and a DOS version for the PC.
The Thing's first console appearance was a cameo in the Spider-Man game based on the Spider-Man 1994 animated series for Sega Mega Drive and the Super Nintendo Entertainment System. After reaching certain levels of the game, the player can call the Thing a limited number of times for assistance against foes.
An evil doppelganger of the Thing appears as an enemy in Marvel Super Heroes: War of the Gems for the Super Nintendo Entertainment System.
The Thing is a playable character in the Fantastic Four game for the PlayStation.
The Thing is also playable in the game based on the 2005 film voiced by Michael Chiklis with his classic appearance voiced by Fred Tatasciore in the bonus levels. One level featured the Thing returned to his usual Ben Grimm identity and having to avoid Doom's robots to reactivate the chamber to restore him to the Thing.
The Thing is a playable character in the fighting game Marvel Nemesis: Rise of the Imperfects voiced by Mark Gibbon.
The Thing is also a playable hero in the game Marvel: Ultimate Alliance, voiced by Gregg Berger. He has special dialogue with the Rhino, the Human Torch, Karnak, Black Bolt, Lockjaw, Crystal, Uatu, and the Vision. The costumes available for him are his Classic costume, his Ultimate costume, his Original costume, and his Modern costume. A simulation disk has Thing protecting Mr. Fantastic from Rhino on the S.H.I.E.L.D. Omega Base.
The Thing is a playable character in Fantastic Four: Rise of the Silver Surfer voiced by Joey Camen.
The Thing appears in Marvel: Ultimate Alliance 2 voiced again by Fred Tatasciore. Like in the comics, the Thing tries to stay neutral regarding the Superhero Registration Act, becoming unavailable in Act 2 of the game as the Act goes into effect, although he becomes available again during a mission involving a superhuman prison convoy moving through New York. If the player is Anti-Registration, the Thing will agree to help them after witnessing the Pro-Registration side's use of nanite-controlled supervillains as agents. If the player is Pro-Registration, he sides with them after the White Star (renegade S.H.I.E.L.D. agents working with Captain America's forces) endanger civilians while trying to put the team down.
The Thing appeared in three virtual pinball games for Pinball FX 2 voiced by Zach Hanks. The first was the Fantastic Four, while the other two were games that were a part of the Marvel Pinball: Avengers Chronicles, the games being World War Hulk and (as Angrir: Breaker of Souls) Fear Itself.
The Thing appears in the Marvel Super Hero Squad video game, voiced by Dave Boat.
The Thing is a playable character in Marvel Super Hero Squad Online, voiced by Dave Boat.
The Thing is available as downloadable content for the game LittleBigPlanet as part of "Marvel Costume Kit 1".
The Thing is a playable character in the MMORPG Marvel Heroes voiced by Dave Boat.
The Thing appears as a playable character in Lego Marvel Super Heroes voiced again by Dave Boat. One bonus mission had him helping Spider-Man fight Lizard in the Central Park Zoo's Reptile House.
The Thing is playable in Marvel: Contest of Champions.
The Thing is a playable character in the mobile game Marvel: Future Fight.
The Thing is a playable character in the mobile game Marvel Puzzle Quest.
The Thing appears in the "Shadow of Doom" DLC of Marvel Ultimate Alliance 3: The Black Order, voiced again by Dave Boat.

In popular culture
 In the March 17, 1979 episode of Saturday Night Live, the Thing appeared in the skit "Superhero Party", attending a party hosted by Superman (Bill Murray) and Lois Lane (Margot Kidder).
 In The Simpsons episode "I Am Furious (Yellow)", a senile/insane version of Stan Lee (Comic Book Guy says that Lee's brain is no longer in "near-mint" condition) tries to cram a Thing action figure into a Batmobile toy. Also, in the "Treehouse of Horror XIV" story "Stop the World, I Want to Goof Off", there is a quick moment where the Simpson family members are turned into members of the Fantastic Four. Homer is the Thing. In "Sex, Pies and Idiot Scrapes" the Thing is shown fighting the Hulk in the middle of an Irish riot (between Orangemen Loyalists and Green Irish Nationalists - the Hulk and Thing taking this conflict to its ultimate illogical conclusion). They are both later shown on the front page of the Springfield newspaper beating up on Homer.
 Michael Chiklis reprises his role of the Thing in the Robot Chicken episode "Monstourage". He is accidentally swapped with Vic Mackey during Vic's bust on a Haitian voodoo practitioner. After shooting Doctor Doom, Vic wonders where the Ben guy that Reed, Sue, and Johnny were talking about went. It then shows the Thing breaking into a drug operation and beating up some thugs as one police officer asks the other if Vic looks different to them.
 The Thing and the Invisible Woman are referenced in particular, along with the rest of the Fantastic Four, throughout the fourth season of Arrested Development
 Professional wrestler CM Punk uses The Thing's catchphrase, “it's clobberin' time!” as part of his ring entrance routine.

Reception
In 2011, IGN ranked the Thing 18th in the "Top 100 Comic Book Heroes", and 23rd in their list of "The Top 50 Avengers" in 2012. The Thing was named Empire magazine's tenth of "The 50 Greatest Comic Book Characters" in 2008.

The Thing was ranked #2 on a listing of Marvel Comics' monster characters in 2015.

In 2022, Screen Rant included The Thing in their "MCU: 10 Most Desired Fan Favorite Debuts Expected In The Multiverse Saga" list.

Lee later noted that The Thing was the most popular character in the Fantastic Four; he surmised that the character fit the classic grotesque archetype, much as Quasimodo was more popular than Claude Frollo, Esmerelda or the more "glamorous" characters in The Hunchback of Notre-Dame. For his next superhero creation, he deliberately drew on that popularity in creating another character who transforms into a huge beast, the Hulk.

Collected editions
 Essential Marvel Two-in-One Vol. 1 (November 2005; includes reprints of MTIO #1-20, 22–25, Annual #1)
 Essential Marvel Two-in-One Vol. 2 (June 2007; includes reprints of MTIO #26-52, Annual #2-3)
 Essential Marvel Two-in-One Vol. 3 (July 2009; includes reprints of MTIO #53-77, Annual #4-5)
 Essential Marvel Two-in-One Vol. 4 (January 2012; includes reprints of MTIO #78-98 and 100, Annual #6-7)
 The Thing Classic Vol. 1 (The Thing #1-10)
 The Thing Classic Vol. 2 (The Thing #11-22, Fantastic Four #274)

References

External links

 The Thing at Marvel.com

Avengers (comics) characters
Characters created by Jack Kirby
Characters created by Stan Lee
Comics characters introduced in 1961
Fantastic Four characters
Fictional American Jews in comics
Fictional astronauts
Fictional aviators
Fictional characters from Manhattan
Fictional characters with immortality
Fictional characters with superhuman durability or invulnerability
Fictional United States Marine Corps personnel
Jewish superheroes
Marvel Comics American superheroes
Marvel Comics characters with superhuman strength
Marvel Comics film characters
Marvel Comics male superheroes
Marvel Comics martial artists
Marvel Comics mutates
Marvel Comics titles